The 2014 Australian National Handball Championship was split into three stages. Stage one was held in Sydney during July for Under 21 & Under 18 titles. Stage two took place in Brisbane during October for the Open titles. Stage three was in Sydney during November for the Under 14 and Under 16 titles.

The Under 18 Boy's was won by Queensland over New South Wales in a three leg tournament as only two teams entered. The Under 21 Women was won by New South Wales over Queensland. Third place was the Australian Capital Territory. The Under 21 Men was won by New South Wales over Australian Capital Territory. Third was Queensland.

In the Men's Open Championship, Queensland defeated Victoria in the final. It was Queensland's first title since 2005. Third place was New South Wales. followed by Australian Capital Territory fourth, South Australia fifth and Western Australia sixth.

In the Women's Open Championship Queensland defended their title, this time over New South Wales. Third was South Australia followed by Victoria fourth, Australian Capital Territory fifth and Western Australia sixth.

The final sector held in Ryde, Sydney was swept by New South Wales winning the Under 14 Boys and Girls and Under 16 Boys and Girls. The only other state participating was Queensland.

Junior Handball Results

Under 21 Women

Final

 Third placed team - Australian Capital Territory

Under 21 Men

Final

 Third placed team - Queensland

Under 18 Boys

Youth Handball Results

Under 16 Boys

Under 16 Girls

Under 14 Boys

Under 14 Girls

Open Handball Results

Men's Handball

Final

3rd place play off

5th place play off

Women's Handball

Final

3rd place play off

5th place play off

References

External links
 Australian Handball webpage
 Photos of Indoor men's final
 Photos of Indoor women's final
 Photos of Indoor Friday's matches
 Photos of Indoor Thursday's games
 U21 Women's report. NSWHF Webpage
 Men's Indoor Final - Youtube
 Women's Indoor Final - Youtube

2014 in Australian sport
Handball competitions in Australia
2014 in handball